Kurt Lindlgruber (1 November 1934 – 20 October 2013) was an Austrian sprint canoeist who competed from the mid to late 1960s. He won a silver medal in the K-4 1000 m event at the 1966 ICF Canoe Sprint World Championships in East Berlin. Lindlgruber also competed in two Summer Olympics, earning his best finish of seventh in the K-4 1000 m event at Mexico City in 1968.

References

Kurt Lindlgruber's profile at Sports Reference.com
Kurt Lindlgruber's obituary (p. 5) 

1934 births
2013 deaths
Austrian male canoeists
Canoeists at the 1964 Summer Olympics
Canoeists at the 1968 Summer Olympics
Olympic canoeists of Austria
ICF Canoe Sprint World Championships medalists in kayak